The British Rail Class 99 was a fleet of train ferries, most of which were owned by Sealink, that carried rail vehicles between Britain and mainland Europe. When British Rail implemented the TOPS system for managing their operating stock, these ships were incorporated into the system in order to circumvent some of the restrictions of the application software. This allowed them to be counted as locomotives while carrying railway vehicles in the same way as a normal locomotive would haul a train.

Details 

There were fifteen BR Class 99s, used for carrying road and rail vehicles from Britain to the continent (road only vehicles did not receive TOPS numbers). They were of various ages and origins, but all carried the BR double arrow logo on their red funnels. This was generally set up so that the upper arrow pointed towards the bow, and so was reversed on the port side of the ship. The hull was painted blue, with "Sealink" written in large grey letters between the waterline and the deck. A grey stripe was painted on some around parts of the top of the hull, with the main body of the ship being grey or white. Unlike other non-steam locomotives with TOPS numbers, no yellow warning panels were provided. Names were painted on the bow and stern but the TOPS numbers were not visibly carried.

The table shows the numbers allocated:

There were also a number of other Sealink vessels which did not carry rail vehicles and so did not receive TOPS numbers.

While in traffic several vessels were involved in various incidents. Vortigern grounded on the approach to Ostend in 1982. Sealink Vanguard collided with European Gateway on the approach to Harwich, also in 1982, causing serious damage to the latter vessel, which nearly sank altogether. This was the most serious accident that a Class 99 was involved in while working for Sealink, resulting in six fatalities.

Disposal 

The mixed origins of the fleet meant that disposal was carried out in a patchy manner, and at no point were all 15 Class 99s in service. Instead, ships were cut up at any time after the 30-year-old mark, and so Sealink disposed of 6 prior to privatisation in 1984. No.99 009 Shepperton Ferry was withdrawn and broken up in Spain in 1972 while No.99 010 Invicta was dismantled in the Netherlands in the same year. No.99 006 Twickenham Ferry, the oldest member of the fleet, was withdrawn for scrap in 1974. No.99 001 Suffolk Ferry, No.99 002 Norfolk Ferry and No.99 003 Essex Ferry were all withdrawn around 1980 and broken up shortly afterwards.

The remaining eight members of the fleet (99 004/5/7/8/11-14) left British Rail ownership when Sealink was sold in 1984, after which they were invariably renamed (sometimes several times, making them harder to trace). The vessels were scattered across the world, with new homes including Cuba, Greece, Canada and Malta. Subsequently four of the ferries (now all over 30 years old) have been broken up, but four were still in service as of 2011. No.99 008 Anderida has, since 1988, been owned by Cooperative de Transport Maritime et Aerien in Canada and is the oldest survivor, dating back to 1971. She now carries the name C.T.M.A. Voyageur and retains several historic features. No.99 013 St. Eloi is now owned by Moby Lines, and is brightly painted as Moby Love. No.99 012 Chartres was recently chartered by Atlanticoline, but now appears to be back at Gibraltar. No.99 005 Speedlink Vanguard, the lowest-numbered (and possibly most-travelled) survivor, has spent time in Cuba and Panama, but in 2011 was registered in Gdańsk as the Birdik I.

Meanwhile, No.99 011 St. Germain was dismantled in India in 1988. No.99 014 Transcontainer I was broken up early in 2001, also in India, while No.99 004 Cambridge Ferry met its end in Turkey in 2003 after working off Malta as Ita Uno and Sirio. No.99 007 Vortigern moved to Greece for ferry services around the islands, for which she was renamed Express Milos. She finished her days as the Nisos Limnos; Greek regulations on the age of passenger ferries prompted her to be sold for scrap in India in 2004.

99 005 Speedlink Vanguard was scrapped in 2013. As time goes by the surviving Class 99s (99008/12/13) will probably also be broken up.

See also
 British Railways ships for details of all ships operated by British Railways and Sealink.

References

Further reading 
 Details of several railway ships, including some of the 99s
 Report (1973)
 Report (1981)

99
Train ferries
British Rail numbering and classification systems
British Rail ferry operations